Knežja Njiva is a small village to the northeast above Markovec in the Municipality of Loška Dolina in the Inner Carniola region of Slovenia. It is known locally as Gorenja.

Church

The local church in the settlement is dedicated to the Holy Trinity and belongs to the parish of Stari Trg.

References

External links
Knežja Njiva on Geopedia

Populated places in the Municipality of Loška Dolina